National City Bank can refer to several entities:

Companies
National City Corp., based in Cleveland, Ohio
National City Bank of New York, now Citibank

Buildings
National City Bank (Evansville, Indiana), listed on the National Register of Historic Places
National City Bank (New York City)
National City Bank Building (Toledo), Ohio
National City Bank Building (Columbus), Ohio

See also
 National Bank